Giannis Varkas (born 27 March 1998) is a Greek professional footballer who plays as a forward for Ilioupoli.

References

1998 births
Living people
Greek footballers
Greece under-21 international footballers
Greece youth international footballers
Super League Greece players
Super League Greece 2 players
Apollon Smyrnis F.C. players
Association football forwards
Footballers from Chalcis
Olympiacos F.C. players